The Acroduster I SA700 is an American single-seat homebuilt aerobatic biplane.

Development
The Acroduster was an elliptical-winged biplane built with the intention of competing against the Pitts Special.

Design
The aircraft also owes some of its design to the Midget Mustang. The fuselage is of aluminum construction rather than the popular tube and fabric for the type. The wings are similar to the Stolp Starduster. Roll rate is 240 degrees per second.

Variants
Beets Special Marketed by Stolp.

Specifications (Acroduster 1)

See also

Notes

References

Budd Davisson, Air Progress, 1975 
Sport Aviation, August 1972 pp. 38 Stolp Arcroduster
Sport Aerobatics, August 1974 pp. 14 New Unlimited Machine - Acroduster I

Acroduster
1970s United States sport aircraft
Homebuilt aircraft
Biplanes
Single-engined tractor aircraft